Mamata Shankar (born 7 January 1955) is an Indian actress and dancer. She is known for her work in Bengali cinema. She has acted in films by directors including Satyajit Ray, Mrinal Sen, Rituparno Ghosh, Buddhadeb Dasgupta and Gautam Ghosh. In addition to being an actress, she is a dancer and choreographer. She was the niece of musician Pandit Ravi Shankar. Her brother, Ananda Shankar, was an Indo-Western fusion musician.

Early life and education
Mamata Shankar was born on 7 January 1955 to the dancers Uday Shankar and Amala Shankar.

She received her training in dance and choreography at the Uday Shankar India Culture Centre, Calcutta under Amala Shankar.

Career
Shankar made her film debut with Mrigayaa in 1976, directed by Mrinal Sen. The film won the National Film Award for Best Feature Film for the year.

Shankar is married, and runs the Udayan - Mamta Shankar Dance Company, which was founded in 1986, and which travels extensively throughout the world, with the 'Mamata Shankar Ballet Troupe'. The troupe was founded in 1978, and performed its first production, based on a Rabindranath Tagore work, Chandalika, in 1979. It was followed by Horikhela, Aajker Ekalabya, Milap, Shikaar, Mother Earth, Amritasyaputra and Sabari.

Personal life
Mamata Shankar has two sons, Ratul Shankar and Rajit Shankar.

Awards
 1992: National Film Award – Special Jury Award (Feature Film):Agantuk
 1993: BFJA Award-Best Supporting Actress Award for "Shakha Prashakha"
 2000: BFJA Award-Best Supporting Actress Award for "Utsab"

Filmography
 Mrigayaa (The Royal Hunt, 1976)
 Oka Oori Katha (The Marginal Ones or The Outsiders, (1977)
 Dooratwa aka Distance (1978)
 Ek Din Pratidin (And Quiet Rolls the Dawn or One Day Like Another (USA), 1979)
 Kharij (The Case Is Closed, 1982)
 Grihajuddha (Crossroads, 1982)
 Dakhal (The Occupation, 1982)
 Ganashatru (An Enemy of the People, 1989)
 Shakha Proshakha (The Branches of the Tree or Les Branches de L'arbre, 1991)
 Agantuk (The Stranger aka Le Visiteur, 1991)
 Sunya Theke Suru (A Return to Zero, 1993)
 Prajapati (1993)
 Sopan (1994)
 Dahan (Crossfire, 1997)
 Utsab (The Festival, 2000)
 The Bong Connection, (2006)
 Samudra Sakshi, (2006)
 Ballyganj Court, (2007)
 Abohomaan (The Eternal, 2010)
 Jaani Dyakha Hawbe (2011)
 Ranjana Ami Ar Ashbona (2011)
 Jaatishwar (2014)
 Agantuker Pore (2015)
 Pink (2016)
 Maacher Jhol (2017)
Flat No 609 (2018)
 Shah Jahan Regency (2019)
 Shesher Golpo (2019)
 Antardhaan (2021)
 Bhotbhoti (2022)
Antarleen
Flat No. 609
Projapoti (2022)
Bijoyar Pore (2023)

References

External links

 Mamta Shankar Dance Company, website
 Mamata Shankar Ballet Troupe website

Indian film actresses
Indian female dancers
Indian women choreographers
Indian choreographers
1955 births
Living people
Actresses from Kolkata
Actresses in Bengali cinema
Gokhale Memorial Girls' College alumni
University of Calcutta alumni
Dancers from West Bengal
20th-century Indian actresses
21st-century Indian actresses
Special Mention (feature film) National Film Award winners
Recipients of the Sangeet Natak Akademi Award